Vaginal ultrasonography is a medical ultrasonography that applies an ultrasound transducer (or "probe") in the vagina to visualize organs within the pelvic cavity. It is also called transvaginal ultrasonography because the ultrasound waves go across the vaginal wall to study tissues beyond it.

Uses

Vaginal ultrasonography is used both as a means of gynecologic ultrasonography and obstetric ultrasonography.

It is preferred over abdominal ultrasonography in the diagnosis of ectopic pregnancy.

See also 
 Gynecologic ultrasonography

References

External links 
 

Medical ultrasonography